Tanahunsur  is a village development committee in Tanahu District in the Gandaki Zone of central Nepal. At the time of the 1991 Nepal census it had a population of 2955 people living in 615 individual households.

There are two peaks at the top of Tanahunsur. We can still observe approximately 200 years old Sen dynasty's old palace area, temples, three canon which is believed to be the birthplace of Prithvi Naryan Shaha's mother.

References

External links
UN map of the municipalities of Tanahu District

Populated places in Tanahun District